Roberto "Bobby" Ramírez Kurtz (born October 29, 1959) is a Puerto Rican politician and the former mayor of Cabo Rojo, Puerto Rico. Ramírez is affiliated with the Popular Democratic Party (PPD) and served as mayor from 2013 until 2021. He assumed office after beating incumbent Perza Rodrígues Quiñones at the 2012 general election. Rodríguez, a member of the New Progressive Party (PNP), became mayor after the death of Santos Padilla Ferrer in the year 2007. Ramírez Kurtz was succeeded by Jorge “Jorgito” Morales Wiscovitch of the PNP after winning the mayoral race at the 2020 general election.

In 2017, Bobby Ramírez Kurtz implemented the "Orange Initiative" (Iniciativa Naranja in Spanish) that was met with controversy. The initiative establishes that the citizens must buy the orange trash bags provided by the trash collecting private company that operates in Cabo Rojo if the citizens want their trash to be collected. Kurtz stopped "Iniciativa Naranja", after days in court, because the government gave funds to Cabo Rojo's junkyard that would last at least 5 years.

References

Living people
Mayors of places in Puerto Rico
Popular Democratic Party (Puerto Rico) politicians
People from Cabo Rojo, Puerto Rico
1959 births